Mount Lubbock  is a coastal peak that rises to  immediately north of Cape Jones at the south end of Daniell Peninsula, Victoria Land, Antarctica. It was discovered in January 1841 by Sir James Clark Ross who named it for Sir John Lubbock, 3rd Baronet, treasurer of the Royal Society.

References

Mountains of Victoria Land
Borchgrevink Coast